Thomas Raymond may refer to:

Thomas Raymond (judge) (1626/27–1683), British judge
Thomas Lynch Raymond (1875–1928), American politician
Thomas Raymond (MP) (died 1418), English politician
Thomas or Toro Raymond

See also